Lucas Matos Martins (born 17 January 1997), known as Lucas Caniggia, is Brazilian footballer who currently plays for Flamurtari Vlorë in the Albanian Superliga.

References

1997 births
Living people
Kategoria Superiore players
Brazilian footballers
Brazilian expatriate footballers
Association football midfielders
Brazilian expatriate sportspeople in Albania
Expatriate footballers in Albania
Sport Club Corinthians Paulista players
Flamurtari Vlorë players